The Red Dancer (French: La danseuse rouge) is a 1937 French drama film directed by Jean-Paul Paulin and starring Véra Korène, Maurice Escande and Jean Worms. The film's sets were designed by the art director Alexandre Lochakoff.

Cast

References

Bibliography 
 Colin Thomas Roust. Sounding French: The Film Music and Criticism of Georges Auric, 1919-1945. University of Michigan, 2007.

External links 
 

1937 films
French drama films
1937 drama films
1930s French-language films
Films directed by Jean-Paul Paulin
French black-and-white films
1930s French films